Filip Klikovać (born 7 February 1989) is a water polo player from Montenegro. He was part of the Montenegrin team at the 2016 Summer Olympics, where the team finished in fourth place.

See also
 List of World Aquatics Championships medalists in water polo

References

External links
 

Montenegrin male water polo players
Living people
1989 births
Olympic water polo players of Montenegro
Water polo players at the 2016 Summer Olympics
World Aquatics Championships medalists in water polo
Mediterranean Games medalists in water polo
Mediterranean Games bronze medalists for Montenegro
Competitors at the 2018 Mediterranean Games